A mechanical system is scleronomous if the equations of constraints do not contain the time as an explicit variable and the equation of constraints can be described by generalized coordinates. Such constraints are called scleronomic constraints. The opposite of scleronomous is rheonomous.

Application

In 3-D space, a particle with mass , velocity  has kinetic energy 

Velocity is the derivative of position  with respect to time .  Use chain rule for several variables:

where  are generalized coordinates.

Therefore,

Rearranging the terms carefully,

If this system is scleronomous, then the position does not depend explicitly with time:

Therefore, only term  does not vanish:

Kinetic energy is a homogeneous function of degree 2 in generalized velocities .

Example: pendulum

As shown at right, a simple pendulum is a system composed of a weight and a string.  The string is attached at the top end to a pivot and at the bottom end to a weight.  Being inextensible, the string’s length is a constant.  Therefore, this system is scleronomous; it obeys scleronomic constraint
 

Take a more complicated example. Refer to the next figure at right, Assume the top end of the string is attached to a pivot point undergoing a simple harmonic motion

Although the top end of the string is not fixed, the length of this inextensible string is still a constant.  The distance between the top end and the weight must stay the same.  Therefore, this system is rheonomous as it obeys constraint explicitly dependent on time

See also
Lagrangian mechanics
Holonomic system
Nonholonomic system
Rheonomous
Mass matrix

References 

Mechanics
Classical mechanics
Lagrangian mechanics

de:Skleronom